Noertzange railway station is a railway station serving Noertzange, in southern Luxembourg.  It is operated by Chemins de Fer Luxembourgeois, the state-owned railway company.

The station is situated on Line 60, which connects Luxembourg City to the Red Lands of the south of the country.  After Noertzange, the main line continues towards Niederkorn, whilst a branch line leads towards Rumelange, to the south, via Kayl.

External links
 Official CFL page on Noertzange station
 Rail.lu page on Noertzange station

Bettembourg
Railway stations in Luxembourg
Railway stations on CFL Line 60